Luka Pasariček (born 12 March 1998, in Croatia) is a Croatian footballer.

References

External links
 

1998 births
Living people
Footballers from Zagreb
Association football midfielders
Croatian footballers
HNK Hajduk Split II players
NK Rudeš players
NK Dubrava players
NK Hrvatski Dragovoljac players
First Football League (Croatia) players
Croatian Football League players